Government Engineering College, Bharatpur
College of Technology & Engineering, Udaipur
Government Engineering College, Ajmer
Government Women Engineering College, Ajmer
Government Engineering College, Jhalawar
University Engineering College, Kota
MBM Engineering College, Jodhpur
Government Engineering College, Bikaner
Manikya Lal Verma Textile and Engineering College, Bhilwara
University College of Engineering & Technology, Bikaner
Government Engineering College, Banswara
Government Engineering College, Dholpur
Government Engineering College, Karauli
Government Engineering College, Baran
Government Engineering College, Barmer

See also 

 List of Kerala Government Engineering Colleges
 List of Maharashtra Government Engineering Colleges
 List of Tamil Nadu Government Engineering Colleges

Rajasthan
Government
Government Engineering Colleges